The East Cobălcescu gas field is a natural gas field located on the continental shelf of the Black Sea. It was discovered in 2013 and developed by PetroCeltic. It will begin production in 2018 and will produce natural gas and condensates. The total proven reserves of the East Cobălcescu gas field are around 491 billion cubic feet (14 km³), and production is slated to be around 200 million cubic feet/day (5.6×106m³) in 2018.

References

Black Sea energy
Natural gas fields in Romania